Tealliocaris is an extinct genus of pygocephalomorphans from the Carboniferous.

Species

The genus contains eight described species:

Tealliocaris caudafimbriata 
Tealliocaris etheridgei 
Tealliocaris formosa 
Tealliocaris loudonensis 
Tealliocaris robusta 
Tealliocaris tarrassiana 
Tealliocaris walloniensis 
Tealliocaris woodwardi

References

 Fossils (Smithsonian Handbooks) by David Ward (Page 69)

Prehistoric Malacostraca
Prehistoric crustacean genera
Carboniferous crustaceans
Fossils of Great Britain
Fossil taxa described in 1908